Jaypee Institute may refer to:
Jaypee Institute of Information Technology, Noida
Jaypee University of Information Technology, Waknaghat
Jaypee University of Engineering and Technology, Guna